The 2019 Arizona Wildcats football team represented the University of Arizona in the 2019 NCAA Division I FBS football season. The season marked the Wildcats' 120th season. They played their home games at Arizona Stadium in Tucson, Arizona (for the 91st year) and competed as members of the South Division (9th season) in the Pac-12 Conference (42nd overall season). They were led by second-year head coach Kevin Sumlin. They finished the season 4–8, 2–7 in Pac-12 play to finish in last place in the South Division.

Defensive coordinator Marcel Yates was fired after eight games due to a poor defensive performance by the team. He was hired to be the defensive backs coach at California in 2020.

Previous season

Offseason 
The Wildcats have 12 senior graduates only graduated players noted until spring practice. As well as one junior who would choose to forgo their senior season in pursuit of an early NFL career. The Wildcats would lose 14 more players from the 2018 team due to various reasons. Notable departures from the 2018 squad included.

Recruiting 

The 2019 football recruiting cycle was the first in which the NCAA authorized two signing periods for high school seniors in that sport. In addition to the traditional spring period starting with National Signing Day in February 2019, a new early signing period was introduced, with the first such period falling from December 19, 2018.

Transfers

Outgoing

Incoming

Position key

Returning starters

Offense

Defense

Special teams

† Indicates player was a starter in 2018 but missed all of 2019 due to injury.

Spring game
The 2019 Wildcats had spring practice in March 2019. The 2019 Arizona football spring game took place in Tucson, AZ on April 13, 2019 at 6:00 pm MT with the Defense team beating the Offense team 87–30.

Preseason

Award watch lists 
Listed in the order that they were released

Pac-12 Media Day
The 2019 Pac-12 Media Day was held on July 24, 2019 in Hollywood, California. Arizona head coach Kevin Sumlin, quarterback Khalil Tate, and running back J. J. Taylor were in attendance to field questions from the media.

In the 2019 Pac-12 preseason media poll, Arizona was voted to finish in fifth place in the South Division.

Preseason All-Pac-12 teams
The Wildcats had 2 players at 2 positions selected to the preseason All-Pac-12 teams.

 
Offense

2nd team

J. J. Taylor – RB

Defense

1st team

Colin Schooler – LB

Specialists

1st team

J. J. Taylor – RET

Personnel

Coaching staff

Roster
{| class="toccolours" style="text-align: left;"
|-
| colspan=11 style="; text-align: center;"| 2019 Arizona Wildcats Football
|-
|valign="top"|
Quarterbacks  
4 Rhett Rodriguez - Junior (6'0, 186)  
12 Kevin Doyle – Sophomore (6'3, 210)
13 Luke Ashworth – Sophomore (6'0, 197)
14 Khalil Tate - Senior (6'2, 215) 
15 Cameron Fietz –  Freshman (6'1, 192)
17 Grant Gunnell – Freshman (6'5, 222)

Running backs
6 Michael Wiley  – Freshman (5'11, 186) 
20 Darrius Smith –  Freshman (5'9, 175)
21 J. J. Taylor -  Junior (5'6, 180)
23 Gary Brightwell – Junior (6'1, 196)  
28 Nazar Bombata – Sophomore (5'11, 195)
33 Nathan Tilford –  Sophomore (6'2, 206) 
34 John Burton – Freshman (5'11, 210)
36 Bryce Coleman –  Junior (5'9, 185)

Wide receiver 
1 Drew Dixon –  Sophomore (6'3, 203) 
4 Boobie Curry  – Freshman (6'2, 206) 
5 Brian Casteel – Junior (6'0, 214) 
7 Jaden Mitchell  – Freshman (5'9, 175) 
8 Thomas Aych –  Sophomore (6'0, 167)
9 Jalen Johnson – Freshman (6'2, 199)
10 Jamarye Joiner –  Freshman (6'1, 210) 
11 Tayvian Cunningham – Junior (5'7, 181)
15 William Gunnell –  Freshman (5'9, 187)
16 Thomas Reid III –  Junior (6'2, 202)
18 Cedric Peterson –  Senior (5'11, 188) (KR+)
25 Devin Green – Freshman (5'10, 166)
35 Karl Altenburg –  Sophomore (5'9, 180)
40 Jashon Butler –  Freshman (5'8, 182) 
41 Daniel Egbo – Senior (6'2, 192)
82 Zach Williams –  Freshman (6'3, 224)  
83 Terrence Johnson –  Senior (6'2, 211) 
86 Stanley Berryhill –  Sophomore (5'9, 169)
88 Vince Ellison – Freshman (6'2, 170)
89 Brice Vooletich –  Freshman (5'10, 194)

Tight end 
39 Tristen D'Angelo – ‘’Sophomore (6'3, 203)42 Connor Hutchings – Junior (6'5, 220) (OL+)  
46 Jack Koceman –  Freshman (6'4, 235) 
80 Jake Peters  –  Freshman (6'4, 235)81 Bryce Wolma - Junior (6'3, 239)Punter 
19 Kyle Ostendorp – Freshman (6'1, 202)26 Matt Aragon -  Senior (6'5, 211) 
32 Jacob Meeker-Hackett - Junior (6'0, 199) (WR+)99 Cameron Weinberg – Freshman (5'11, 177) (K+)  
|width="25"| 
|valign="top"|	

Offensive lineman 
50 Josh McCauley –  Junior (6'3, 292) (OL+)
53 Jon Jacobs –  Junior (6'4, 300) (OL+)
54 Bryson Cain –  Junior (6'4, 291) (OT+) 
55 Jamari Williams – Freshman (6'3, 298) (OL+)  
56 Josh Donovan –  Junior (6'5, 317) (OL+) 
60 Mykee Irving –  Freshman  (6'3, 337) (OL+)
63 Steven Bailey – Senior (6'3, 318) (OL+) 
66 Robert Congel –  Sophomore (6'3, 315) (OL+) 
67 David Watson – Sophomore (6'3, 307) (OL+) 
72 Edgar Burrola –  Sophomore (6'5, 293) (OL+) 
74 Paiton Fears –  Junior (6'5, 308) (OL+) 
75 Zach Lord – Junior (6'7, 275)  (OT+) 
76 Cody Creason –  Senior (6'4, 294) (OT+)
77 Jordan Morgan – Freshman (6'5, 287)78 Donovan Laie – Sophomore (6'4, 318) (OL+)
79 Tyson Gardner –  Sophomore (6'3, 277) (OL+)

Defensive lineman
12 JB Brown – Junior (6'3, 244) (DE+) 
19 Kwabena Watson – Freshman (6'2, 210) (DE+)
40 Dante Diaz–Infante – Junior (6'1, 250) (DE+)
45 Issaiah Johnson – Sophomore (6'1, 235) (DL+)
55 Chandler Kelly – Freshman (6'2, 209) (DL+)
58 Nahe Sulunga –  Freshman (6'2, 270) (DT+)  
81 Jalen Cochran –  Junior (6'3, 249) (DE+)
86 Justin Belknap –  Senior (DE+) 
90 Trevon Mason – Junior (6'4, 285) (DL+)
91 Finton Connolly -  Senior (6'5, 275) (DT+) 
92 Kyon Barrs – Freshman (6'2, 299) (DT+)
94 Naz Higgins – Freshman (6'3, 272) (DT+)
99 Myles Tapousa – Junior (6'1, 330) (DL+)

Linebackers 
1 Tony Fields II – Junior (6'1, 225)7 Colin Schooler – Junior (6'0, 226) 
8 Anthony Pandy – Junior (6'0, 225) 
9 Dayven Coleman – Sophomore (6'2, 216)14 Kylan Wilborn – Junior (6'2, 245) (STUD+) 
26 Eddie Siaumau – Freshman (6'3, 235)27 Derrion Clark – Freshman (6'1, 211)38 Dante Smith – Sophomore (5'10, 223) 
44 Calib McRae - Freshman (6'1, 246)48 Parker Henley –  Sophomore (5'11, 222)49 Jalen Harris –  Sophomore (6'4, 212) (STUD+) 
51 Lee Anderson III – Senior (6'1, 235) (STUD+)
53 Richard Merritt –  Junior (6'0, 216)56 Rexx Tessler –  Sophomore (5'9, 209)Placekicker 
43 Lucas Havrisik - Junior (6'2, 173)80 Nathan Halsell – Freshman (6'1, 201)|width="25"| 
|valign="top"|

Defensive backs
2  Lorenzo Burns -  Junior (5'10, 173) (CB+)
3  Jarrius Wallace –  Junior (6'1, 180) (S+) 
4  Christian Roland-Wallace – Freshman (5'11, 198) (CB+)
5  Christian Young – Sophomore (6'1, 209) (S+)
6  Scottie Young Jr. – Junior (5'11, 200) (S+)
10 Malcolm Holland -  Senior (5'11, 189) (CB+)
11 Troy Young – Junior (6'0, 205) (S+)
13 Chacho Ulloa – Senior (5'11, 192) (S+)
15 McKenzie Barnes – Sophomore (6'1, 178) (CB+)
17 Jace Whittaker -  Senior (5'11, 182) (CB+)  
18 Dhameer Warren – Freshman (6'1, 175) (CB+)
21 Jaxen Turner – Freshman (6'0, 190) (CB+)
23 Malik Hausman -  Sophomore (6'0, 170) (CB+)
24 Rhedi Short –  Sophomore (6'0, 184) (S+) 
25 Bobby Wolfe – Freshman (6'1, 170) (CB+) 
29 Samari Springs – Junior (6'0, 189) (S+)  
30 Quinn Sullivan – Freshman (5'11, 181) (S+)  
31 Tristan Cooper – Senior (6'1, 188) (S+)
32 Blake Washington – Freshman (5'9, 182) (S+)  
33 Blake Pfaff  –  Sophomore  (5'11, 182) (S+) 
37 Xavier Bell –  Sophomore (6'2, 192) (S+)   
47 Rourke Freeburg –  Sophomore (6'2, 200) (S+)

Long snapper
51 Donald Reiter -  Junior (5'10, 235)  
61 Seth Mackellar – Freshman (5'11, 195)|-
|colspan="7"|Source and player details:
|}

Depth chart
Starters and backups.

Depth Chart Source: 2019 Arizona Wildcats Football Fact BookTrue FreshmanDouble Position : *

Schedule
Arizona announced its 2019 football schedule on December 4, 2018. The 2019 Wildcats' schedule consists of 6 home and 6 away games for the regular season. Arizona host 4 Pac-12 opponents  Oregon State, UCLA, Utah and Washington, host 5 Pac-12 opponents on the road to arch-rival Arizona State for the 92nd annual Territorial Cup to close out the regular season, Colorado, Oregon, Stanford and USC. Arizona is not scheduled to play Pac-12 North opponents California and Washington State for the 2019 Pac-12 regular season. The Wildcats has 3 bye weeks comes during Week 1 (on August 31), Week 4 (on September 21) and Week 11 (on November 9).

Arizona's out of conference opponents represent the Big Sky, Big 12 and Mountain West conferences. The Wildcats will host two non–conference games which are against Northern Arizona from the (Big Sky) and Texas Tech (Big 12) and travel to Hawaii from the (Mountain West).

Schedule Sources:

Game summaries
at Hawaii

 

Sources: ESPN

Statistics

In the season opener, Arizona traveled to Hawaii for the first time since 1998. Both teams would battle back and forth for most of the game. After three quarters, the score was tied at 35 and Hawaii took the lead in the fourth quarter. In the final seconds, the Wildcats threatened to force overtime down 45-38, but were stopped a yard short of the end zone and began the year 0–1.

Northern Arizona

Sources: ESPN

Statistics

Following their painful defeat at Hawaii, the Wildcats hosted in-state foe NAU in their home opener. The Wildcats would dominate the Lumberjacks and evened their record at a game apiece.

Texas Tech

  

Sources: ESPN

Statistics

In an interesting matchup, Arizona faced Texas Tech. Both teams would trade scores all game long until the Wildcats took control in the fourth quarter to pull away for the win and improved their record to 2–1.

UCLA

  

Sources: ESPN

Statistics

In their conference opener, the Wildcats hosted UCLA. Both teams’ defenses would stop the offenses throughout the first half with the Bruins ahead at the break, 7-6. In the second half, Arizona took the lead with a long touchdown before the Bruins answered with a score of their own to retake the lead, 17-13. In the fourth quarter, the Wildcats drove down the field and scored to regain the lead at 20-17. UCLA tried to come back, but missed a tying field goal attempt in the final minute and Arizona escaped with the win and their record improved to 3–1.

at Colorado

Sources: 

Statistics

Arizona played their first Pac-12 road game at Colorado. After trailing at halftime, the Wildcats outscored the Buffaloes in the second half to win it to go to 4–1. Unfortunately, this would be Arizona’s final victory of the season, as they would lose out the rest of the way.

Washington

  

Sources:

Statistics

The Wildcats hosted Washington in their next game and looked to extend their winning streak. After falling behind early, Arizona found a rhythm and took a 17-13 lead before halftime. However, in the second half, things would fall apart for the Wildcats as they would commit several mistakes, which allowed the Huskies to take advantage and break the game open and Arizona never recovered, leading to the Wildcats’ second loss of the season.

at USC

Sources:

Statistics

The Wildcats traveled to USC to face the Trojans. Arizona’s offense would struggle early on and their defense would be no match for USC’s powered offense. The Wildcats avoided a shutout by scoring twice in the fourth quarter, but their deficit was too much to overcome for another loss.

at Stanford

Sources:

Statistics

The Wildcats stayed on the road by traveling up to Stanford. Despite hanging with the Cardinal for most of the game, Arizona’s defense would play poorly and ended up losing yet again and their record dropped to 4–4. Days after the loss, Arizona fired its defensive coordinator as Sumlin needed a change to fix the team’s problems on defense.

Oregon State

Sources:

Statistics

On homecoming day, the Wildcats hosted Oregon State. Arizona hoped a change at defensive coordinator would turn things around for their defense. However, their troubles continued as they gave up several touchdowns to the Beavers and Arizona’s offense was unable to rally late and lost their fourth straight game. It was the fourth consecutive game that the Wildcats’ defense gave up at least 40 points or more.

at Oregon

 

Sources:

Statistics

Arizona returned to the road and went to Oregon to take on the sixth-ranked Ducks. By playing in a loud environment, the Wildcats would get dominated by the Ducks and only scored a pair of field goals and fell to 4–6 on the season with their fifth consecutive defeat.

Utah

 

Sources:

Statistics

In their final home game of the season, the Wildcats hosted seventh-ranked Utah in an attempt to get back to their winning ways with an upset victory. However, the Utes would become too much for the Wildcats, as they put up points and Arizona’s offense struggled all night. In the fourth quarter, with most of the Arizona Stadium crowd heading for the exits, the Wildcats would score a touchdown to break up a shutout bid by the Utes. In the final seconds, the remaining Arizona fans chanted “Fire Sumlin”, apparently having been fed up with the team continually losing. In the end, Arizona lost its seventh game of the year and their sixth in a row, which ended their chances of becoming bowl-eligible.

at Arizona State

 

Sources:

Statistics

To conclude the season, Arizona traveled to Arizona State for the annual rivalry game. The Wildcats hoped to end their losing streak and avenge the previous season’s loss to ASU after collapsing late.

After a scoreless first quarter, the Sun Devils would strike first with a field goal in the second quarter. The Wildcats would get on the board with a touchdown for a 7-3 lead. ASU would add another field goal before halftime to cut the deficit to a point. In the third quarter, turnovers would hurt Arizona as led to Arizona State gaining an advantage to take a 21-7 lead. By the fourth quarter, ASU extended their lead with yet another field goal. The Wildcats would finally score again with a late touchdown to get within ten, but did not get any closer to fall 24-14, and the Territorial Cup trophy remained in Arizona State’s hands for the third consecutive year. 

The Wildcats ended the season on a seven-game losing skid and a 4—8 record, with Arizona fans finally been relieved from football and shifted their attention towards basketball.

Statistics
{| class="wikitable collapsible collapsed"
|-
! colspan="3"| Team Statistics
|-
!   !! Arizona !! Opponents
|-
| Points || 151 || 117
|-
| First Downs || 98 || 104
|-
| Rushing || 44 || 32
|-
| Passing || 52 || 60
|-
| Penalty || 2 || 12
|-
| Rushing Yards || 1,022 || 549
|-
| Rushing Attempts || 169 || 125
|-
| Average Per Rush || 6.0 || 4.4
|-
| Average per game || 255.5 || 137.2
|-
| Rushing TDs || 10 || 6
|-
| Passing Yards || 1,187 || 1,344
|-
| Comp–Att-INT || 88–134–4 || 114–193–9
|-
| Average per game || 296.8 || 336.0
|-
| Average per catch || 13.5 || 11.8
|-
| Average per pass || 8.9 || 7.0
|-
| Passing TDs || 10 || 9
|-
| Total Offense || 2,209 || 1,893
|-
| Total Plays || 303 || 318
|- 
| Average Per Yards/Game || 7.3/552.3 || 6.0/473.2
|-
| Kickoffs: # – Yards  || 27–1,730 || 23–1,436
|-
| Average per kick || 64.1 || 62.4
|-
| Net kick average || 40.3 || 41.2
|-
| Punts: # – Yards  || 17–667 || 14–616
|-
| Average per punt || 39.2 || 44.0
|-
| Net punt average || 35.7 || 39.6
|-
| Kick Returns: # – Yards || 7–113 || 5–116
|-
| TDs || 0 || 0
|-
| Average  || 16.1 || 23.2
|-
| Long || 23 || 37
|-
| Punt Returns: # – Yards || 2–41 || 4–20
|-
| TDs || 0 || 0
|-
| Average || 20.5 || 5.0
|-
| Long || 42 || 8
|-
| INT Returns: # – Yards  || 9–84 || 4–49
|-
| Average || 9.3 || 12.2
|-
| Long || 27 || 49
|-
| Fumbles – Fumbles Lost || 2–1 || 2–2
|-
| Penalties – Yards || 36–326 || 23–169
|-
| Average || 81.5 || 42.2
|-
| Time of possession/game || 29:40 || 30:20
|- 
| 3rd–Down Conversion % || 33/63 (52%) || 29/59 (49%)
|- 
| 4th–Down Conversion % || 5/5 (100%) || 4/10 (40%) 
|-
| XP attempts || 18–19 (95%) || 15–15 (100%)
|-
| Field goal attempts || 3–5 || 4–5
|-
| Onside kicks || 0–0 || 0–0
|-
| Touchdown scored || 18 || 13
|-
| Red-zone scores || 13–15 (87%) || 12–13 (92%)
|-
| Red-zone touchdowns || 10–15 (67%) || 9–13 (69%)
|-
| MISC Yards || 0 || 0
|-
| Sacks by: - # Yards  || 4–8 || 7–30
|-
|}

Offense
Rushing
Note: G = Games played; ATT = Attempts; YDS = Yards; AVG = Average yard per carry; LG = Longest run; TD = Rushing touchdowns

Passing
Note: G = Games played; COMP = Completions; ATT = Attempts; COMP % = Completion percentage; YDS = Passing yards; TD = Passing touchdowns; INT = Interceptions; EFF = Passing efficiency

Receiving
Note: G = Games played; REC = Receptions; YDS = Yards; AVG = Average yard per catch; LG = Longest catch; TD = Receiving touchdowns

Defense
Note: G = Games played; Solo = Solo tackles; Ast = Assisted tackles; Total = Total tackles; TFL-Yds = Tackles for loss-yards lost; Sack = Sacks; INT = Interceptions; PD = Passes defended; FF = Forced fumbles; FR = Forced recoveries

Special teamsKick and punt returningNote: G = Games played; PR = Punt returns; PYDS = Punt return yards; PLG = Punt return long; KR = Kick returns; KYDS = Kick return yards; KLG = Kick return long; TD = Total return touchdowns

 KickingNote: G = Games played; FGM = Field goals made; FGA = Field goals attempted; LG = Field goal long; XPT = Extra points made; XPT ATT = XPT attempted; In20 = Kicking inside the 20; 20-29 = Kicking inside the 20-29; 30-39 = Kicking inside the 30-39; 40-49 = Kicking inside the 40-49; 50 = Kicking inside the 50; TP = Total pointsPuntingNote: G = Games played; P = Punts; YDS = Yards; AVG = Average per punt; LG = Punt long; In20 = Punts inside the 20; TB = Touchbacks

Scoring

Scores by quarter (non-conference opponents)

Scores by quarter (Pac-12 opponents)

Scores by quarter (All opponents)

Awards and honors

Postseason

2020 NFL draft

The 2020 NFL Draft will be held on April 23–25, 2020 in Paradise, Nevada.Wildcats who were picked in the 2020 NFL Draft:'Media affiliates
Radio
ESPN Radio – (ESPN Tucson 1490 AM & 104.09 FM) – Nationwide (Dish Network, Sirius XM, TuneIn radio and iHeartRadio)
KCUB 1290 AM – Football Radio Show – (Tucson, AZ)
KHYT – 107.5 FM (Tucson, AZ)
KTKT 990 AM – La Hora de Los Gatos (Spanish)'' – (Tucson, AZ)
KGME 910 AM – (IMG Sports Network) – (Phoenix, AZ)
KTAN 1420 AM – (Sierra Vista, AZ)
KDAP 96.5 FM (Douglas, Arizona)
KWRQ 102.3 FM – (Safford, AZ/Thatcher, AZ)
KIKO 1340 AM – (Globe, AZ)
KVWM 970 AM – (Show Low, AZ/Pinetop-Lakeside, AZ)
XENY 760 – (Nogales, Sonora) (Spanish)

TV 
CBS Family - KOLD (CBS), CBSN 
ABC/ESPN Family - KGUN (ABC), ABC, ESPN, ESPN2, ESPNU, ESPN+, 
FOX Family - KMSB (FOX), FOX/FS1, FSN 
Pac-12 Network (Pac-12 Arizona)

References

Arizona
Arizona Wildcats football seasons
Arizona Wildcats football